Labeo greenii is a species of fish in the genus Labeo from the Congo River system in central Africa.

References 

Labeo
Fish described in 1902